The University Athletic Association of the Philippines beach volleyball tournament started in SY 2006-07 as a demonstration sport. The event is now held yearly. It is held at the SM Sands by the Bay in Pasay.

UAAP beach volleyball champions

Individual awards

Most Valuable Player

Rookie of the Year

Number of championships by school

See also
UAAP Volleyball Championship
NCAA Beach Volleyball Championship (Philippines)

External links
UAAP Beach Volleyball at Spikeithard.com

References

Beach volleyball
Beach volleyball competitions
College men's volleyball tournaments in the Philippines
College women's volleyball tournaments in the Philippines